A scribe is a person who serves as a professional copyist, especially one who made copies of manuscripts before the invention of automatic printing.

The profession of the scribe, previously widespread across cultures, lost most of its prominence and status with the advent of the printing press. The work of scribes can involve copying manuscripts and other texts as well as secretarial and administrative duties such as the taking of dictation and keeping of business, judicial, and historical records for kings, nobles, temples, and cities. The profession has developed into public servants, journalists, accountants, bookkeepers, typists, and lawyers. In societies with low literacy rates, street-corner letter-writers (and readers) may still be found providing scribe service.

Ancient Egypt

One of the most important professionals in ancient Egypt was a person educated in the arts of writing (both hieroglyphics and hieratic scripts, as well as the demotic script from the second half of the first millennium BCE, which was mainly used as shorthand and for commerce) and arithmetic. Sons of scribes were brought up in the same scribal tradition, sent to school, and inherited their fathers' positions upon entering the civil service.

Much of what is known about ancient Egypt is due to the activities of its scribes and the officials. Monumental buildings were erected under their supervision, administrative and economic activities were documented by them, and stories from Egypt's lower classes and foreign lands survive due to scribes putting them in writing.

Scribes were considered part of the royal court, were not conscripted into the army, did not have to pay taxes, and were exempt from the heavy manual labor required of the lower classes (corvée labor). The scribal profession worked with painters and artisans who decorated reliefs and other building works with scenes, personages, or hieroglyphic text.

The hieroglyph used to signify the scribe, to write and writings, etc., is Gardiner sign Y3, Y3 from the category of 'writings, & music'. The hieroglyph contains the scribe's ink-mixing palette, a vertical case to hold writing-reeds, and a leather pouch to hold the black and red ink blocks. The demotic scribes used rush pens which had stems thinner than that of a reed (2 mm). The end of the rush was cut obliquely and then chewed so that the fibers became separated. The result was a short, stiff brush which was handled in the same manner as that of a calligrapher.

Thoth was the god credited with the invention of writing by the ancient Egyptians. He was the scribe of the gods who held knowledge of scientific and moral laws.

Egyptian and Mesopotamian functions

In addition to accountancy and governmental politicking, the scribal professions branched out into literature. The first stories were probably creation stories and religious texts. Other genres evolved, such as wisdom literature, which were collections of the philosophical sayings from wise men. These contain the earliest recordings of societal thought and exploration of ideas in some length and detail.

In Mesopotamia during the middle to late 3rd millennium BCE, the Sumerians originated some of this literature in the form of a series of debates. Among the list of Sumerian disputations is the Debate between bird and fish. Other Sumerian examples include the Debate between Summer and Winter where Winter wins, and disputes between the cattle and grain, the tree and the reed, silver and copper, the pickaxe and the plough, and the millstone and the gul-gul stone.

An Ancient Egyptian version is The Dispute between a man and his Ba, which comes from the Middle Kingdom period.

China 
The written word can be traced back as far as 1400 BCE in ancient China. It was originally used for divination, with characters etched onto turtle shells to interpret cracks caused by exposure to heat. By the sixth century BCE, scribes were producing books called "jiance or jiandu,". These books were made from bamboo strips, each containing a single column of script, bound together with hemp, silk, or leather. Paper, the scribal tool China is known for originating, was likely invented by an imperial eunuch named Cai Lun in 105 CE. The invention of paper later allowed for the invention of wood block printing, where paper was rubbed onto an inked slab to copy the characters. Despite this invention, calligraphy remained a prized skill due to the belief that: "...the best way to absorb the contents of a book was to copy it by hand,".

Chinese scribes played an instrumental role in the imperial government's civil service. During the Tang dynasty, private collections of Confucian classics began to grow. Young men hoping to join the civil service would need to pass an exam based on Confucian doctrine, and these collections, which became known as "academy libraries" were places of study. Within this merit system, owning books was a sign of status. Despite the later importance of Confucian manuscripts, they were initially heavily resisted by the Qin dynasty. Though their accounts are likely exaggerated, later scholars describe a period of book burning and scholarly suppression. This exaggeration likely stems from Han dynasty historians being steeped in Confucianism as state orthodoxy.

Similarly to the west, religious texts, particularly Buddhist, were transcribed in monasteries and hidden "...during times of persecution...". In fact, the earliest print book found was a copy of the Diamond Sutra from 868 CE, which was found in a walled-in cave called Dunhuang.

As professionals, scribes would undergo three years of training before becoming novices. The title "scribe" was inherited from father to son. Early in their careers, they would work with local and regional governments and did not enjoy an official rank. A young scribe needed to hone their writing skills before specializing in an area like public administration or law. Archeological evidence even points to scribes being buried with marks of their trade such as brushes "...administrative, legal, divinatory, mathematical, and medicinal texts.." thus showing a personal understanding of the importance of their profession

The Triptaka, Buddhist texts, emerged at the beginning of the first century. Buddhist texts were treasured and sacred throughout Asia and were written in different languages. Buddhist scribes believed that, “The act of copying them could bring a scribe closer to perfection and earn him merit.”

Judaism
Scribes of ancient Israel were a literate minority in an oral based-culture. Some of them belonged to the priestly class, other scribes were the record-keepers and letter-writers in the royal palaces and administrative centers, affiliated with the ancient equivalent of professional guilds. 
There were no scribal schools in Israel during the early part of the Iron Age (1200–800 B.C.E.). Between the 13th and 8th centuries B.C.E., the Hebrew alphabetic system had not been developed. Only after the appearance of the Kingdom of Israel, Finkelstein points to the reign of Omri, did the scribal schools begin to develop, reaching their culmination in the time of Jeroboam II, under Mesopotamian influence. The eventual standardization of the Hebrew writing system between the eighth and sixth centuries B.C.E. would presumably have given rise to codified rules and principles of language that scribes would then have learned. The education of scribes in ancient Israel was supported by the state, although some scribal arts could have been taught within a small number of families.
Some scribes also copied documents, but this was not necessarily part of their job.

The Jewish scribes used the following rules and procedures while creating copies of the Torah and eventually other books in the Hebrew Bible.

 They could only use clean animal skins, both to write on, and even to bind manuscripts.
 Each column of writing could have no less than 48, and no more than 60, lines.
 The ink must be black, and of a special recipe.
 They must say each word aloud while they were writing.
 They must wipe the pen and wash their entire bodies before writing the most Holy Name of God, YHVH, every time they wrote it.  Also before they would write the Most Holy Name of God, they would wash their hands 7 times.
 There must be a review within thirty days, and if as many as three pages required corrections, the entire manuscript had to be redone.
 The letters, words, and paragraphs had to be counted, and the document became invalid if two letters touched each other. The middle paragraph, word and letter must correspond to those of the original document.
 The documents could be stored only in sacred places (synagogues, etc.).
 As no document containing God's Word could be destroyed, they were stored, or buried, in a genizah (Hebrew: "storage").

Sofer

Sofers (Jewish scribes) are among the few scribes that still do their trade by hand, writing on parchment. Renowned calligraphers, they produce the Hebrew Torah scrolls and other holy texts.

Accuracy

Until 1948, the oldest known manuscripts of the Hebrew Bible dated back to CE 895. In 1947, a shepherd boy discovered some scrolls dated between 100 BCE and CE 100, inside a cave west of the Dead Sea. Over the next decade, more scrolls were found in caves and the discoveries became known collectively as the Dead Sea Scrolls. Every book in the Hebrew Bible was represented except the Esther. Numerous copies of each book were discovered, including 25 copies of the book of Deuteronomy.

While there were other items found among the Dead Sea Scrolls not currently in the Hebrew Bible, and many variations and errors occurred when they were copied, the texts, on the whole, testify to the accuracy of the scribes. The Dead Sea Scrolls are currently the best route of comparison to the accuracy and consistency of translation for the Hebrew Bible because they are the oldest out of any biblical text currently known.

Corrections by the scribes and editing biblical literature
Priests who took over the leadership of the Jewish community preserved and edited biblical literature. Biblical literature became a tool that legitimated and furthered the priests' political and religious authority.

Corrections by the scribes (Tiqqun soferim) refers to changes that were made in the original wording of the Hebrew Bible during the second temple period, perhaps sometime between 450 and 350 BCE. One of the most prominent men at this time was Ezra the scribe. He also hired scribes to work for him, in order to write down and revise the oral tradition. After Ezra and the scribes had completed the writing, Ezra gathered the Jews who had returned from exile, all of whom belonged to Kohanim families. Ezra read them an unfamiliar version of the Torah. This version was different from the Torah of their fathers. Ezra did not write a new bible. Through the genius of his ‘editing', he presented the religion in a new light.

Europe in the Middle Ages

Monastic scribes
In the Middle Ages, every book was made by hand. Specially trained monks, or scribes, had to carefully cut sheets of parchment, make the ink, write the script, bind the pages, and create a cover to protect the script. This was all accomplished in a monastic writing room called a scriptorium which was kept very quiet so scribes could maintain concentration. A large scriptorium may have up to 40 scribes working. Scribes woke to morning bells before dawn and worked until the evening bells, with a lunch break in between. They worked every day except for the Sabbath. The primary purpose of these scribes was to promote the ideas of the Christian Church, so they mostly copied classical and religious works. The scribes were required to copy works in Latin, Greek, and Hebrew whether or not they understood the language. These re-creations were often written in calligraphy and featured rich illustrations, making the process incredibly time-consuming. Scribes had to be familiar with the writing technology as well. They had to make sure that the lines were straight and the letters were the same size in each book that they copied. It typically took a scribe fifteen months to copy a Bible. Such books were written on parchment or vellum made from treated hides of sheep, goats, or calves. These hides were often from the monastery's own animals as monasteries were self-sufficient in raising animals, growing crops, and brewing beer. The overall process was too extensive and costly for books to become widespread during this period. Although scribes were only able to work in daylight, due to the expense of candles and the rather poor lighting they provided, monastic scribes were still able to produce three to four pages of work per day. The average scribe could copy two books per year. They were expected to make at least one mistake per page. During the twelfth and thirteenth centuries, copying became more of a specialized activity and was increasingly performed by specialists. To meet expanding demand, the pecia system was introduced, in which different parts of the same text were assigned to hired copiers working both in and out of the monasteries.

Female scribes
Women also played a role as scribes in Anglo-Saxon England, as religious women in convents and schools were literate. Excavations at medieval convents have uncovered styli, indicating that writing and copying were done at those locations. Also, female pronouns are used in prayers in manuscripts from the late 8th century, suggesting that the manuscripts were originally written by and for female scribes.

Most of the evidence for female scribes in the early middle ages in Rome is epigraphic. There have been eleven Latin inscriptions uncovered from Rome that identify women as scribes. In these inscriptions we meet with Hapate who was known as a shorthand writer of Greek and lived until the age of 25.  Corinna who was known as a storeroom clerk and scribe. Three were identified as literary assistants; Tyche, Herma, and Plaetoriae. There were also four women who have been identified by the title of libraria. Libraria is a term that not only indicates clerk or secretary but more specifically literary copyist. These women were Magia, Pyrrhe, Vergilia Euphrosyne and a freed woman who remains nameless in the inscription. To the inscriptions and literary references we can add one final piece of Roman-period evidence for female scribes: an early-2nd-century marble relief from Rome that preserves an illustration of a female scribe. The woman is seated on a chair and appears to be writing on some kind of a tablet, she is facing the butcher who is chopping meat at a table.

In the 12th century within a Benedictine monastery at Wessobrunn, Bavaria there lived a female scribe named Diemut. She lived within the monastery as recluse and professional scribe. Two medieval book lists exist that have named Diemut as having written more than forty books. Fourteen of Diemut's books are in existence today. Included in these are four volumes of a six volume set of Pope Gregory the Great's Moralia in Job, two volumes of a three-volume Bible, and an illuminated copy of the Gospels. It has been discovered that Diemut was a scribe for as long as five decades. She collaborated with other scribes in the production of other books. Since the Wessobrunn monastery enforced its strict claustration it is presumed that these other scribes were also women. Diemut was credited with writing so many volumes that she single-handedly stocked the Wessobrunn's library. Her dedication to book production for the benefit of the Wessobrunn monks and nuns eventually led to her being recognized as a local saint. At the Benedictine monastery within Admont, Austria it was discovered that some of the nuns had written verse and prose in both Latin and German. They delivered their own sermons, took dictation on wax tablets, and copied and illuminated manuscripts. They also taught Latin grammar and biblical interpretation at the school. By the end of the 12th century they owned so many books that they needed someone to oversee their scriptorium and library. Two female scribes have been identified within the Admont Monastery; Sisters Irmingart and Regilind.

There are several hundred women scribes that have been identified in Germany. These women worked within German women's convent from the thirteenth to the early 16th century. Most of these women can only be identified by their names or initials, by their label as "scriptrix", "soror", "scrittorix", "scriba" or by the colophon (scribal identification which appears at the end of a manuscript). Some of the women scribes can be found through convent documents such as obituaries, payment records, book inventories, and narrative biographies of the individual nuns found in convent chronicles and sister books. These women are united by their contributions to the libraries of women's convents. Many of them remain unknown and unacknowledged but they served the intellectual endeavor of preserving, transmitting and on occasion creating texts. The books they left their legacies within were usually given to the sister of the convent and were dedicated to the abbess, or given or sold to the surrounding community. There are two obituaries that have been found that date back to the 16th century, both of the obituaries describe the women who died as a "scriba". In an obituary found from a monastery in Rulle, describes Christina Von Haltren as having written many other books.

Women's monasteries were different from men's in the period from the 13th to the 16th century. They would shift their order depending on their abbess. If a new abbess would be appointed then the order would change their identity. Every time a monastery would shift their order they would need to replace, correct and sometimes rewrite their texts. Many books survived from this period. Approximately 4,000 manuscripts have been discovered from women's convents from late medieval Germany. Women scribes served as the business women of the convent. They produced a large amount of archival and business materials, they recorded the information of the convent in the form of chronicles and obituaries. They were responsible for producing the rules, statutes and constitution of the order. They also copied a large amount of prayer books and other devotional manuscripts. Many of these scribes were discovered by their colophon.

Despite women being barred from transcribing Torah scrolls for ritual use, a few Jewish women between the thirteenth and sixteenth centuries are known to have copied other Hebrew manuscripts. They learned the craft from male scribes they were related to, and were unusual because women were not typically taught Hebrew. Knowledge of these women scribes comes from their colophon signatures.

Town scribe
The scribe was a common job in medieval European towns during the 10th and 11th centuries. Many were employed at scriptoria owned by local schoolmasters or lords. These scribes worked under deadlines to complete commissioned works such as historic chronicles or poetry. Due to parchment being costly, scribes often created a draft of their work first on a wax or chalk tablet.

Notable scribes
 Ahmes
 Amat-Mamu
 Amina, bint al-Hajj ʿAbd al-Latif
 Baruch ben Neriah
 Ben Sira
 Dubhaltach MacFhirbhisigh
 Demetrius Erasmius
 Ezra
 Matthew the Apostle
 Máel Muire mac Céilechair
 Metatron
 Poggio Bracciolini
 Sidney Rigdon
 Sîn-lēqi-unninni
 Zayd ibn Thabit

See also
 Asemic writing
 List of ancient Egyptian scribes
 Scrivener
 The Seated Scribe
 Worshipful Company of Scriveners

References

Further reading
 
 
 Tahkokallio, Jaako. (2019). “Counting Scribes: Quantifying the Secularization of Medieval Book Production”. Book History, 22(1), pg. 1-42.

External links

 

Ancient Egyptian culture
Clay tablets
Historical legal occupations
Obsolete occupations
 
Textual scholarship
Writing occupations